Ai Van was born on October 30, 1954 in Hue Street, Hanoi. Her family is an artistic family. Mother is a popular artist Ai Lien. Father is Ha Quang Dinh who owned and directed Vietnamese Film Studio (first private film studio in Vietnam). She is the 12th child out of 14. Her siblings Ai Xuan and Ai Thanh are also singers.
From 1969 to 1978, Ai Van studied music at the Hanoi Conservatory of Music and worked at Theater of Folk Music and Dance. In 1990 Ai Van went into the German Democratic Republic to study and directing of musical shows. After the fall of Berlin Wall, Ai Van crossed to West Germany and became a refugee.  In 1994, Ai Van moved from Germany to the United States to live and perform, where she was loved by the Vietnamese Americans through folk songs, love songs, and traditional Vietnamese dance episodes.

Activism
After retiring from a successful career, Ai Van became an activist for democracy and human rights.

References

People from Hanoi
20th-century Vietnamese women singers
1954 births
Living people
21st-century Vietnamese women